Prunus sect. Microcerasus is a section of Prunus. It used to be included in Prunus subg. Cerasus, but phylogenetic research indicates it belongs to Prunus subg. Prunus. It differs from Prunus subg. Cerasus by having three winter buds per axil.

Species 
Species in this section are often called bush cherries or dwarf cherries. They include:

 Prunus alaica
 Prunus albicaulis
 Prunus bifrons
 Prunus brachypetala
 Prunus chorossanica
 Prunus dictyoneura
 Prunus erythrocarpa
 Prunus erzincanica
 Prunus glandulosa
 Prunus griffithii
 Prunus hippophaeoides
 Prunus humilis
 Prunus incana
 Prunus jacquemontii
 Prunus japonica
 Prunus microcarpa
 Prunus pogonostyla
 Prunus pojarkovii
 Prunus prostrata
 Prunus pseudoprostrata
 Prunus pumila
 Prunus pumila var. besseyi
 Prunus pumila var. depressa
 Prunus susquehanae
 Prunus tianshanica
 Prunus tomentosa
 Prunus verrucosa
 Prunus yazdiana

Hybrids:
 Prunus × cistena

References 

 
Plant sections
Microcerasus